Jari Jäväjä (born 16 August 1973) is a retired Finnish football striker.

References

1973 births
Living people
Finnish footballers
Vaasan Palloseura players
Helsingin Jalkapalloklubi players
Tampereen Pallo-Veikot players
Käpylän Pallo players
Oulun Luistinseura players
AC Oulu players
Association football forwards
Finland international footballers
People from Kemi
Sportspeople from Lapland (Finland)